AT&T Business Internet (ATTBI) is a provider of Internet access and services. It is a service of AT&T, a global Fortune 500 company with $181 billion in revenues in 2020. ATTBI provides local access.  It is available in 59 countries.  Extended access features allow users to reach 147 additional countries.

ATTBI provides DSL services with speeds ranging from 25 to 500 Mbps, and fiber-optic services at up to 1 Gbps.

References

External links
AT&T Business Home Page

Information technology companies of the United States
Companies based in Texas
Internet service providers
AT&T subsidiaries